Shihāb al-Dīn Abū al-ʿAbbās Aḥmad ibn Muḥammad ibn ʿAlī ibn Ḥajar al-Haytamī al-Makkī al-Anṣārī known as Ibn Hajar al-Haytami al-Makki was an Egyptian Arab muhaddith and theologian of Islam. He came from the Banu Sa'd tribe who settled in the Al-Sharqiah province in Egypt. Ibn Hajar was specialized in Islamic Jurisprudence and well known as a prolific writer of the Shâfi'î school.  With al-Imām Aḥmad al-Ramlī, he represents the foremost resource for fatwa (legal opinion) for the entire late Shâfi‘î school.

Biography

Birth and education

Ibn Hajar al-Haytamī was born in 909 AH (1503 AD) in the small village Abū Haytam in western Egypt. When he was a small child, his father died and his upbringing was left to the charge of his grandfather.  His grandfather was known to the locals as the "stone" because of his pious nature. The nickname came from people saying he was "silent as a stone".  This was due to the fact that he seldom spoke and when he did it was greatly revered for his religious knowledge.  His grandfather died, however, shortly after his father and his father's teachers Shams Dīn b. Abi'l-Hamā'il and Shams al-Dīn Muhammad al-Shanāwī became his caretakers. As a child he began his studies with the memorisation of the Qur'an and Nawawi's Minhaj. His caretaker al-Shanāwī decided that al-Haytamī should continue his elementary education at the sanctuary of Sayyid Ahmad al-Badawī in Tanta.

Ibn Hajar al-Haytami notes in his writings a beverage called qahwa developed from a tree in the Zeila region.

Teachers

After completing his elementary education, Ibn Hajar al- Haytamī continued his schooling at al-Azhar where he studied under many noteworthy scholars, the most predominant one being Zakariyyā’ al-Ansārī. He also studied under the famous Shafi'i scholar Shihab al-Din al-Ramli.

Migration to Mecca

Al-Haytamī performed the Hajj in the year 1527 with one of his teachers al-Bakri. It was during this trip that al-Haytamī decided to begin writing fiqh.  He returned to Mecca in 1531 and stayed there a year before returning home again.  During this visit al-Haytamī worked on a compilation of notes which he would later use in his authorship to write commentaries.  The last time he traveled to Mecca was in 1533, this time he brought his family and decided to permanently reside there.
His life dedication in Mecca began to be writing, teaching, and issuing fatwa.  He authored major works in Shāfiʿī jurisprudence, hadīth, tenets of faith, education, hadīth commentary, and formal legal opinion.  It was at this time he wrote his most notable work, which was called "Tuhfat al-Muhtaj bi Sharh al-Minhaj".  This work was a commentary on Imam Nawawi's writing "Minhaj al-Talibin".  Ibn Hajar al-Haytamī's commentary became one of the two authoritative textbooks of the Shafi’i school.  He wrote many other works, some of which are listed in the "works" section of this page.

Death

Ibn Hajar al-Haytamī died in 1566 AD/973 AH in Mecca. He was buried in the cemetery of Ma'lat.

Views
 Regarding singing al-Haytami mentioned that some went so far as to claim the supposed consensus of ahl ul Madinah on this question.
 He was once asked about the legal status of those who criticizes Sufis: Is there an excuse for such critics? He replies in his Fatawa hadithiyya: It is incumbent upon every person endowed with mind and religion not to fall into the trap of criticizing these folk (Sufis), for it is a mortal poison, as has been witnessed of old and recently.
Regarding logical reasoning: "Consider these words without partisanship and you will find that he…has clarified the way and established the proof to the effect that there is nothing in [logic] which is reprehensible or leads to what is reprehensible, and that it is of use in the religious sciences such as the science of the principles of religion and of jurisprudence (fiqh).  The jurist have established the general principle that what is of use for the religious sciences should be respected and may not be derided, and it should be studied and taught as a fard kifaya"

Works
Al-Sawa'iq al-Muhriqah
Al-Naimat-ul Kubra Ala al-Alam
Asma al-Matalib
Tahrir al-Maqal fi Adab wa Ahkam fi ma yahtaj ilay-ha Mu'addibu al-Atfal
Mablaghu'l Arab fi Fadayil al-Arab
Al-Jawhar al-Munazzam fi Ziyarati'l Qabr
As-Sawayiq al-Muhriqah ala Ahl al-Bidayi wa'd Dalali wa'z Zandaqah
Tuhfatu'l Muhtaj li Sharh Al-Minhaj (in four volumes)
Al-Khayrat al-Hisan fi Manaqib Abi Hanifah an-Numan
"Al Fatawa al-Rizwiyyah
Al-Fatawa al-Haytamiyyah
Al-Fatawa al-Hadithiyyah
Fat'h Al-Ilah Sharh Mishkah
Al-Eeaab fi Sharh al-Ubab
Al-Imdad fi Sharh al-Irshad
Fat'h al-Jawwad bi Sharh al-Irshad
Al-Fat'h al-Mubin Sharh al-Arbayin an-Nawawiyyah
Nasihatu'l Muluk
Asraf al-Wasayil ila Fahmi'sh Shamayil
Madan al-Yawaqit al-Multamiah fi Manaqib Al-Ayimmah al-Arba'ah
Al-Minah al-Makkiyyah fi Sharfi Hamziyyah al-Busiriyyah
Al-Manhaj al-Qawim fi Masayil at-Talim. Sharh Muqadammati'l Hadramiyyah
Ad-Durar az-Zahirah fi Kashfi Bayani'l Akhirah
Az-Zawajir an Iqtirafal-Kabayir
Tahdhir ath-Thiqat min Akli'l Kaftati wa'l Qat
Al-Iylam bi Qawatiy al-Islam
Kaffar-Raa'a min Muharramati'l Lahwi wa's Sama'a
Al-Fatawa al-Fiqhiyyah al-Kubra

See also 
 List of Ash'aris and Maturidis
 List of Muslim theologians
 List of Sufis

References 

Asharis
Shafi'is
Shaykh al-Islāms
Sunni fiqh scholars
Sunni Muslim scholars of Islam
Sunni imams
Sunni Sufis
Egyptian Sufis
Egyptian imams
Egyptian Sunni Muslim scholars of Islam
Shafi'i fiqh scholars
Hadith scholars
16th-century Muslim theologians
Critics of Ibn Taymiyya
Critics of Ibn al-Qayyim
Critics of Shia Islam
1503 births
1566 deaths
16th-century Arabs
Supporters of Ibn Arabi